The Man Who Laughs is a 1966 Italian historical drama film based on the 1869 novel of the same name by Victor Hugo.

Plot

In this version, the character of Gwynplaine is renamed Angelo (played by Jean Sorel). His disfigurement is represented as a single broad slash across his mouth, crude yet convincing. While he deals with this, he also falls for a beautiful girl named Dea. The story (which is attributed, in the movie credits, to the director, producer and others involved in making the film, but not to Victor Hugo) has the disfigured acrobat being seduced by a noblewoman and in so doing becomes a henchman for the Borgias. Meanwhile, Dea miraculously acquires her eyesight and falls in love with a young nobleman. This nobleman is marked for death not just by Angelo's employers but by Angelo as well over the loss of Dea. Angelo's assassination attempt fails and he is mortally wounded. In the final scene the escaping Angelo staggers into a Leper Colony and falls dead.

Cast 
 Lisa Gastoni - Lucrezia Borgia
 Jean Sorel - Angelo Bello / Astorre Manfredi
 Edmund Purdom - Cesare Borgia
 Ilaria Occhini - Dea 
 Nando Poggi - Umberto
 Pierre Clémenti
 Gianni Musy
 Linda Sini

References

External links 

1966 drama films
1966 films
Italian drama films
Films directed by Sergio Corbucci
Films scored by Carlo Savina
Films based on works by Victor Hugo
Films set in the 16th century
Films set in Italy
Films shot in Italy
Cultural depictions of Cesare Borgia
Cultural depictions of Lucrezia Borgia
1960s Italian-language films
1960s Italian films